Abun is a District in Tambrauw Regency in Southwest Papua, Indonesia. Its district capital is Warmandi.

Administrative divisions
Abun is divided into 5 villages which are:

Warmandi
Waibem
Wau
Weyaf
Weprari

Demography

Population
As of the 2010 census, the population of Abun was 603.

References

Populated places in Southwest Papua
Populated places in Tambrauw

Southwest Papua